Ardagh is a townland in the fertile district known as the Laggan in East Donegal, part of County Donegal, Ireland. It is very near St. Johnston. It became part of the large Abercorn Estate and was settled by mainly Lowland Scots settlers during the Plantation of Ulster.

See also
 List of towns and villages in Ireland

External links
 Ardagh Townland, Co. Donegal at townlands.ie

Townlands of County Donegal